The Laval Rouge et Or (Red and Gold) are the athletic teams that represent Université Laval, located in Quebec City, Quebec. Home games are all held in the PEPS indoor and outdoor sports facilities.

Varsity teams
Laval Rouge et Or teams compete in:
 Badminton (M/W)
 Basketball (M/W)
 Cross country running (M/W)
 Diving (M/W)
 Downhill skiing (M/W)
 Cross-country skiing (M/W)
 Golf (M/W)
 Football (M)
 Rugby (W)
 Soccer (M/W)
 Swimming (M/W)
 Tennis (M/W)
 Track and field (M/W)
 Triathlon (M/W)
 Volleyball (M/W)

Football 

The Laval Rouge et Or football team began its first regular season in 1996 and has quickly become one of the most successful programs in U Sports history. The Rouge et Or have won a record ten Vanier Cup championships and their most recent victory occurred at the 54th Vanier Cup in 2018. They are also the only program to have played in four straight Vanier Cups. The team has also won the Dunsmore Cup 14 times since 1999, demonstrating their historical dominance in their conference. They are the only Canadian University team in U Sports that returns 1 million dollars to its Institution of Learning the University of Laval.

See also 
 U Sports
 Vanier Cup

References

External links 
 
 Sport's history at Laval University

Université Laval
U Sports teams
Sports teams in Quebec City
U Sports teams in Quebec